The 1977–78 season was the 76th season in which Dundee competed at a Scottish national level, playing in the First Division for the second consecutive season. The club would again fail to achieve promotion, finishing in 3rd place for the second straight year. Dundee would also compete in both the Scottish League Cup and the Scottish Cup, where they would be eliminated by Queen of the South in the 3rd round of the League Cup, and by Celtic in the 3rd round of the Scottish Cup.

Scottish First Division 

Statistics provided by Dee Archive.

League table

Scottish League Cup 

Statistics provided by Dee Archive.

Scottish Cup 

Statistics provided by Dee Archive.

Player statistics 
Statistics provided by Dee Archive

|}

See also 

 List of Dundee F.C. seasons

References

External links 

 1977-78 Dundee season on Fitbastats

Dundee F.C. seasons
Dundee